Sheila Macdonald Bird OBE FRSE FMedSci ( Gore; born 18 May 1952) is a Scottish biostatistician whose assessment of misuse of statistics in the British Medical Journal (BMJ) and BMJ series ‘Statistics in Question’ led to statistical guidelines for contributors to medical journals. Bird's doctoral work on non-proportional hazards in breast cancer found application in organ transplantation where beneficial matching was the basis for UK's allocation of cadaveric kidneys for a decade. Bird led the Medical Research Council (MRC) Biostatistical Initiative in support of AIDS/HIV studies in Scotland, as part of which Dr A. Graham Bird and she pioneered Willing Anonymous HIV Surveillance (WASH) studies in prisons. Her work with Cooper on UK dietary bovine spongiform encephalopathy (BSE) exposure revealed that the 1940–69 birth cohort was the most exposed and implied age-dependency in susceptibility to clinical vCJD progression from dietary BSE exposure since most vCJD cases were younger, born in 1970–89. Bird also designed the European Union's robust surveillance for transmissible spongiform encephalopathies in sheep which revolutionised the understanding of scrapie.

Record linkage studies in Scotland were central to Bird's work (with others) on the late sequelae of Hepatitis C virus infection and on the morbidity and mortality of opioid addiction. Her team first quantified the very high risk of drugs-related death in the fortnight after prison-release, in response to which Bird and Hutchinson proposed a prison-based randomized controlled trial of naloxone, the opioid antagonist, for prisoners-on-release who had a history of heroin injection. Bird introduced the Royal Statistical Society’s statistical seminars for journalists and awards for statistical excellence in journalism. She is the first female statistician to have  been awarded four medals by the Royal Statistical Society (Guy bronze, 1989; Austin Bradford Hill, 2000; Chambers, 2010, Howard, 2015).

Early life and education 
Bird was born in Inverness, Scotland on 18 May 1952 to Isabella Agnes Gordon (née Macdonald) and Herbert Gore. She was educated at Elgin Academy in Scotland, where the mathematics master, Lewis Grant, introduced her to statistics. She graduated with a joint-honours in mathematics and statistics from the University of Aberdeen. From 1974-1976 she was a research assistant in medical statistics at the University of Edinburgh where she, Jones and Rytter quantified the misuse of statistics in the BMJ. In his editorial, Stephen Lock "took on the chin" their 1977 paper and championed statistical guidelines for contributors to medical journals. Doctoral work followed, begun at the University of Edinburgh and supervised by Stuart Pocock, on the analysis of survival in breast cancer which Bird undertook part-time during a lectureship in statistics at the University of Aberdeen (1976–80) before joining the Medical Research Council's Biostatistics Unit in Cambridge in 1980.

Career 
Bird works for the Medical Research Council (MRC), as Programme Leader at their Biostatistics Unit in Cambridge.

Publication of Bird's 23 articles on ‘Statistics in Question’ in the BMJ led to her running World Health Organization (WHO) workshops on research methods in diarrhoeal diseases for Third World paediatricians, through which she and Dilip Mahalanabis  designed and piloted a clinical record-form which was subsequently adopted for all WHO-funded randomised controlled trials (RCTs) of oral rehydration solutions (ORS). The common record facilitated a subsequent exploratory analysis of individual patient data by Bird and Fontaine. This suggested benefit from lower osmolarity solutions, which was then formally tested in a series of RCTs with global change to low osmolarity ORS adopted in 2001.

Back in Cambridge, Bird worked with paediatrician Dr Colin Morley on the British Randomised Evaluation of ALEC Therapy (BREATHE), the first RCT to demonstrate a one-third reduced mortality in premature babies by administration at birth of artificial surfactant. ALEC (artificial lung expanding compound) was named for Alec Bangham FRS, who developed it. Non-Cambridge neonatologists’ prior belief was elicited by ‘trial roulette’ and had centred on a one quarter-reduction, the effect-size that BREATHE was powered to detect.

Work on transplantation statistics in the 1980s with Gilks and Bradley led to beneficial matching being adopted as the basis of UK's exchange of cadaveric donor kidneys. To estimate the potential for cadaveric solid organ donation from brainstem-dead donors, Bird designed UK's first confidential audit of all deaths in intensive care units which revealed that relatives’ refusal –rate (then 30%, since risen to 40%), not doctors’ failure to ask, was the fundamental problem.

Bird led the MRC Biostatistical Initiative in support of AIDS/HIV studies in Scotland (1990–1995), which included projection of Scotland's cases of severe immunodeficiency (so-called CD200 cases) and HIV epidemiological studies in prisons, both with co-investigator, clinical immunologist Dr A. Graham Bird.

Bird's work at the interface of public health and other jurisdictions continued. A series of record-linkage studies in Scotland on the late sequelae of Hepatitis C virus infection (with Hutchinson and Goldberg) and on the high risk of drugs-related death soon after prison-release (or after hospital-discharge for drug-treatment clients) followed.  With Cooper, she estimated UK's dietary exposure to BSE by birth-cohort and they deduced lower susceptibility to vCJD-progression from dietary BSE exposure at older ages. Bird also designed the European Union's robust surveillance at abattoirs for late-stage transmissible spongiform encephalopathies in sheep.

Bird served on four working parties of the Royal Statistical Society (RSS): Counting with Confidence, Statistics and Statisticians in Drug Regulation, Performance Monitoring in the Public Services (as chair) and Statistical Issues in First-in-Man Studies. As RSS's vice-president for external affairs (2005–09), Bird introduced statistical seminars for journalists and the RSS's awards for statistical excellence in journalism; and supported Straight Statistics by contributing over 100 articles, many  on H1N1 pandemic influenza, others based on her 20-weekly reporting with Colonel Clive Fairweather on military fatality-rates in Afghanistan by nationality and cause. Bird led the RSS's campaign for legislation to end the late registration of inquest deaths in England, Wales and Northern Ireland.

Honours and awards 
As Sheila M. Gore, she won the Guy Medal in Bronze in 1989.
Bird was appointed OBE in 2011 for services to social statistics. She was made a Fellow of the Royal Society of Edinburgh in 2012. In 2018, she received an honorary doctorate from the University of Edinburgh.

Personal life 
In September 1999 she and Bird married. Six weeks after their marriage he was diagnosed with glioblastoma multiforme and died in January 2000. Up until his death she published under her maiden name, Gore, however since she has published under her married name of Bird, in her husband's honour.

References

External links

1952 births
British statisticians
Women statisticians
Fellows of the Royal Society of Edinburgh
Officers of the Order of the British Empire
Academics of the University of Strathclyde
Living people